Club Real América is a football club from Santa Cruz, Bolivia currently playing at Santa Cruz Primera A, one of the first division regional leagues. The club has a convenium with Mexican giant Club América.
They play their home games at the Estadio Ramón Tahuichi Aguilera. Real Amèrica has never competed in the Liga de Fútbol Profesional Boliviano.

Football clubs in Bolivia
Association football clubs established in 1968
1968 establishments in Bolivia